{{Infobox military conflict
|conflict= Battle of San Juan del Monte
|partof=the Philippine Revolution
|campaign=
|image=
|caption= Pinaglabanan Shrine Park in San Juan, Metro Manila.
|date= August 30, 1896
|place= San Juan del Monte, Manila, Captaincy General of the Philippines
|casus=
|territory=
|result=Spanish victory
Start of the revolution in Luzon
|combatant1= Katipunan Sovereign Tagalog Nation
|combatant2= Spanish Empire
|commander1= Andrés Bonifacio Emilio Jacinto Ramon Bernardo
|commander2= Ramón Blanco Camilo Rambaud Bernardo Echaluce
|strength1=  800~1000+
|strength2=  100+ combined civil guards, infantrymen and artillerymen
|casualties1= 153 deathsabout 200 captured
|casualties2 = 2 deaths
}}

The Battle of San Juan del Monte' also refers as "Battle of Pinaglabanan" took place on August 30, 1896. It is considered as the first major battle of the Philippine Revolution, which sought Philippine independence from Spain. The first battle cry of the Katipunan coincided with the pealing of church bells at nine o'clock on the night of August 29, 1896.

Background
At 5 pm on the 29th, the Supremo Andrés Bonifacio and 800 Katipuneros met up with Katipunero Felix Sanchez, chairman of the Sapa chapter, at Hagdang Bato in San Felipe Neri. By 7 pm, with a thousand men, including the local police force, they attacked the civil guards, who surrendered immediately. However, the Tala chapter chairman, Katipunero Buenaventura Domingo, allowed the parish priest to escape. Troops under Santiago V. Alvarez, Artemio Ricarte and Mariano Trías were deployed in Noveleta and San Francisco de Malabon in Cavite. Bonifacio, along with Genaro de los Reyes and Vicente Leyba, proceeded to San Juan del Monte.

Battle

After the discovery of Katipunan on 19 August 1896, Andrés Bonifacio became aware of the Spanish government's plans for military action. On 25 August, Bonifacio deployed several of his men around the Pasong Tamo bridge when he heard infantrymen and Spanish guardia civil coming to raid communities around the bridge.

On the evening of 29 August, Bonifacio, with his aide Emilio Jacinto, led a group of Katipuneros towards El Polvorin, a Spanish powder magazine situated in San Juan del Monte. Spanish infantry and artillerymen, armed with German Mauser rifles, guarded Polvorin; the Katipuneros were generally armed with bolo knives, a few assorted guns, bamboo spears and anting-antings.

After two successful skirmishes with the civil guards, Bonifacio was joined by 300 men from Santolan.  The chapter chairman was Valentin Cruz.

By midnight, a small second group of Katipuneros, under the command of Sancho Valenzuela, and coming from Santa Mesa, arrived at Polvorin. This group was composed of 100 Katipunan members, two of them women: Luisa Lucas and Segunda Fuentes Santiago.

According to some accounts, the next day, 30 August, at about 4:00 a.m., Bonifacio and his men launched their surprise attack, capturing the 'Polvorin' several hours later. Supposedly, the Spanish troops retreated to the nearby building of El Depósito, the Manila water works deposit office, after having lost their commander and another man killed. However, more recent research by Katipunan researcher Jim Richardson, using memoirs and reports demonstrates that contrary to myth, the Katipuneros never captured the 'Polvorin' and never killed the Spanish commander, Captain of Artillery Camilo Rambaud, who continued to serve the Spanish Colonial Army long after the opening battle.

Florencio Inocentes noted Bonifacio's courageous leadership during the battle: "Worthy of admiration also was the action of the Supremo, who, in the center of the road in front of the house of Don Martin Ocampo, knelt on one knee and continued shooting his revolver at the enemy artillery soldiers shooting with their Mauser rifles."

Before noon, the 73rd "Jolo" Regiment, composed of Filipino soldiers under Spanish officers, under the command of General Bernardo Echaluce y Jauregui, arrived as Spanish reinforcements at San Juan del Monte to assist in suppressing the rebellion. The 73rd Regiment, like most of the native conscripts in the Spanish army in the Philippines, were armed with the Remington Rolling Block rifle.

Another confusing aspect of the battle is that in reality there were two separate engagements, one at San Juan del Monte where Bonifacio with from 1,000-2,500 Katipuneros attempted to storm the 'Polvorin' defended by Captain Rambaud, and the one at Santa Mesa where one of Bonifacio's generals, Ramon Bernardo with about a thousand Katipuneros engaged a force of Guardia Civil, Carabineros and native Infantry until the Spanish relief column under Echaluce drove them off, having sustained about 80 casualties during the fight with another 50 being lost during the retreat down the Pasig. Contemporary Spanish reportage did not distinguish between the two separate actions which led to them being referred to as a single battle.

Richardson also notes that contrary to popular myth, Sancho Valenzuela was more an extremely unfortunate bystander who was implicated in the revolution rather than a heroically tragic leader. According to Julio Nakpil, “Sancho Valenzuela was innocent. He was neither initiated in the Katipunan nor in Masonry. He was implicated because the revolutionists ate at his rope factory in Sta. Mesa.”

The revolutionaries regrouped at Santa Mesa and engaged the arriving Spanish troops. The 73rd Regiment, together with the garrison of the magazine, almost wiped out Bonifacio's men, leaving about 150 dead and capturing over 200. Despite the Katipunaneros being numerically superior, the Spaniards inflicted heavy losses to Bonifacio which he will never recover. This disastrous outcome forced Bonifacio to retreat towards the Pasig River.

Reactions
After the unsuccessful attack at Polvorin, armed resistance spread towards Central Luzon and provinces along Southern Tagalog.

At 8:00 p.m. on 30 August, Governor-General Ramón Blanco y Erenas issued an executive order placing the eight provinces of Manila, Pampanga, Laguna, Cavite, Batangas, Bulacan, Nueva Ecija and Tarlac under martial law. As a lesson to revolutionaries, the Katipuneros captured at Polvorin were summarily tried and executed. One of them was Sancho Valenzuela, who was dragged off in chains together with his men, Modesto Rivera, Eugenio Silvestre and Ramon Peralta, towards the tribunal.

To ease the increasing tension throughout the colony, Blanco offered a pardon to Filipino rebels who would lay down their arms and surrender to the Spanish authorities. Dr. Pío Valenzuela, the chief physician and aide of Bonifacio, was one of the first Katipuneros who availed himself of this amnesty. However, after his surrender, he was deported and imprisoned in Madrid, and later incarcerated in a Spanish outpost in Africa.

Aside from granting amnesties to returning rebels, the Spanish colonial government also assisted on trying and executing several members of the Katipunan. Fifty-seven of the revolutionaries at San Juan del Monte were executed on 31 August 1896. On 4 September, Sancho Valenzuela, Rivera, Silvestrre and Peralta were executed, on the Campo de Bagumbayan, facing the Luneta Esplanade. On 12 September, thirteen revolutionaries were executed in Cavite.

Legacy

The present-day design of the Philippine flag features the eight-ray sun, which, some of the provinces that Blanco took under martial law on August 30, 1896 took a representation. The eight rays of the sun represent the eight provinces that initiated revolution against Spain: Manila, Cavite, Bulacan, Pampanga, Nueva Ecija, Bataan, Laguna and Batangas, though historian Ambeth Ocampo listed Tarlac instead of Bataan.

On July 25, 1987, former President Corazon C. Aquino signed Executive Order 292 which declared the last Sunday of August each year as a public holiday in the Philippines. This commemorates the Cry of Pugad Lawin and the start of the Philippine Revolution.

In 1974, the Pinaglabanan Shrine was unveiled in San Juan, along Pinaglabanan Street. "Pinaglabanan" is a Tagalog word for "fought over". The present-day San Juan Elementary School stands on the former grounds of the ruined El Polvorín''. In 2006, a museum for the Katipunan was opened by the San Juan city government located by the shrine.

References

Bibliography
  
 
 
 
  

Conflicts in 1896
1896 in the Philippines
Battles of the Philippine Revolution
History of Metro Manila
San Juan, Metro Manila
Last stands